The 1982 Ice Hockey World Championships took place in Finland from the 15 April to the 29 April. The games were played in Helsinki and Tampere with eight teams playing a single round-robin, followed by the top four teams playing each other once more. This was the 48th World Championships, and also the 59th European Championships of ice hockey. The Soviet Union became World Champions for the 18th time, and also won their 21st European Championship.

The tournament is notable since Canada, reinforced by Wayne Gretzky after the Edmonton Oilers were shockingly knocked out of the Stanley Cup playoffs by Los Angeles, would have won the silver medal if the Soviet team had beaten Czechoslovakia in the final game. However, the teams played to a scoreless tie, knocking the Canadians down to the bronze; this led to speculation that the Soviets and Czechs had played to a draw on purpose. Gretzky did score more points than any other player in the tournament (14), in his only appearance at the World Championships, but the Soviet Union's Viktor Shalimov was selected as "Best Forward".

Other notable events include the Czechs' loss to West Germany for the first time in forty-five years, since being beaten in triple overtime to then-Nazi Germany in 1937. The Italians (with a squad boasting seventeen Italian Canadians), beat the Americans and became the first promoted team to survive relegation since the tournament expanded to eight teams in 1959. The tourney was a disaster for the Americans; just two years after winning gold at the 1980 Winter Olympics, they lost every game but one, a tie with West Germany on the final day. The U.S. was thus relegated to Group B for 1983 (they won that tourney and were promoted in 1984 to the top group, where they have been ever since).

Organization of the tournament was overseen by Kalervo Kummola, the chief executive officer of SM-liiga.

World Championship Group A (Finland)

First round

The United States was relegated to Group B.

Final round

World Championship Group B (Austria)
Played in Klagenfurt, Austria from March 18–27. Like the finals of Group A, the Group B tournament also ended in controversy. After the Chinese had defeated the Dutch (relegating them), China would also avoid relegation -- unless Romania and Switzerland played to a tie. They did just that (3-3) on March 27, in a match derided as a "scandalous parody" by some observers; Romania thus finished with three head-to-head points, Switzerland two, and China one, relegating the Chinese.

East Germany was promoted to Group A, and both China and the Netherlands were relegated.

World Championship Group C (Spain)
Played in Jaca March 19–28.

Both Japan and Yugoslavia were promoted to Group B.

Ranking

Tournament Awards
Best players selected by the directorate:
Best Goaltender:       Jiří Králík
Best Defenceman:       Viacheslav Fetisov
Best Forward:          Viktor Shalimov
Media All-Star Team:
Goaltender:  Jiří Králík
Defence:  Viacheslav Fetisov,  Alexei Kasatonov
Forwards:  Bill Barber,  Wayne Gretzky,  Sergei Makarov

Final standings
The final standings of the tournament according to IIHF:

European championships final standings
The final standings of the European championships according to IIHF:

Scoring leaders
List shows the top skaters sorted by points, then goals.

Citations

References

Complete results

IIHF Men's World Ice Hockey Championships
World Championships
1982
World Ice Hockey Championships, 1982
International sports competitions in Helsinki
World Ice Hockey
1980s in Helsinki
Sports competitions in Tampere
World Ice Hockey
1981–82 in Austrian ice hockey
1981–82 in Spanish ice hockey
International ice hockey competitions hosted by Austria
International ice hockey competitions hosted by Spain
Sports competitions in Klagenfurt